The Hollier, also known as the Vincent-Hollier, was an automobile built in Chelsea and Jackson, Michigan by Charles Lewis, president of the Lewis Spring and Axle Company from 1915 to 1921.  The Hollier was available originally with a V-8 engine of their own design.  A later offering, starting in 1917, was powered by a six-cylinder Falls engine.  Only open models were built. After the war ended, the company name was changed.

Models

References

 

Defunct motor vehicle manufacturers of the United States
Motor vehicle manufacturers based in Michigan
Defunct companies based in Michigan
Jackson, Michigan
Washtenaw County, Michigan